The Canada women's national 3x3 basketball team is the basketball side that represents Canada in international 3x3 basketball (3 against 3) competitions. It is organized and run by Canada Basketball.

World Cup record

See also
 Canada women's national basketball team

References

External links
Official website

3x3
Women's national 3x3 basketball teams